Douglas T. Porter (born August 15, 1929) is a former American football coach and college athletics administrator. He served as the head coach at Mississippi Valley State University (1961–1965), Howard University (1974–1978), and Fort Valley State University (1979–1985, 1987–1996), compiling a career college football record of 155–110–5. He was also an assistant coach at Grambling State University under Eddie Robinson between his stints at Mississippi Valley State and Howard. Porter was inducted into the College Football Hall of Fame in 2008.

A native of Memphis, Tennessee, Porter played high school football at Father Betrand High School. He played college football as a quarterback at Xavier University of Louisiana in New Orleans for three seasons and later earned a Master of Science degree from Indiana University. Porter served in the United States Army from 1951 to 1954, reaching the rank of first lieutenant. In 1954, was as an assistant coach at Father Betrand High School, working on the staff of his father, W. P. Porter. He then returned to Xavier as backfield coach and director of intramural sports. In August 1961, Porter was appointed as athletic director and head football coach at Mississippi Vocation College—now known as Mississippi Valley State University—in Itta Bena, Mississippi.

Head coaching record

Notes

References

External links
 

1929 births
Living people
American football quarterbacks
Fort Valley State Wildcats athletic directors
Fort Valley State Wildcats football coaches
Grambling State Tigers football coaches
Howard Bison football coaches
Mississippi Valley State Delta Devils and Devilettes athletic directors
Mississippi Valley State Delta Devils football coaches
Xavier Gold Rush football coaches
Xavier Gold Rush football players
High school football coaches in Tennessee
College Football Hall of Fame inductees
Indiana University alumni
United States Army officers
Coaches of American football from Tennessee
Players of American football from Memphis, Tennessee
Military personnel from Tennessee
African-American coaches of American football
African-American players of American football
African-American college athletic directors in the United States
African-American United States Army personnel
20th-century African-American sportspeople
21st-century African-American sportspeople